Skyyjammer is the fifth  album  by New York City based  group Skyy released in 1982  on  Salsoul Records.

Track listing

Charts

Singles

References

External links
 Skyy-Skyyjammer  at Discogs

1982 albums
Skyy (band) albums
Salsoul Records albums